The COMEN (COnfederación MEditerránea de Natación) Cup was a competition in the sport of water polo, organized by the Mediterranean Swimming Confederation the period from 1984 to 2007. Participation rights had clubs from European, African and Asian countries bordering the shores of the Mediterranean Sea like Spain, France, Italy, Malta, Greece, Cyprus, Egypt, Yugoslavia and after her split Croatia, Montenegro and Serbia. Ιn addition there was the possibility of participation of clubs that did not qualify, simply as visitors.

Title holders 

 1984  POŠK
 1985  POŠK
 1986  POŠK
 1987  Mladost
 1988 Not held
 1989  Partizan
 1990  Mladost
 1991  Jadran Split
 1992  Volturno
 1993 Not held
 1994  Como
 1995  Jadran Split
 1996  VK Primorje Rijeka
 1997 Not held
 1998  Dubrovnik
 1999 Not held
 2000  Ortigia
 2001  Ortigia
 2002  Camogli
 2003-06  Not held
 2007  Sori

References

International club water polo competitions
+
+
+
Defunct water polo competitions
Recurring sporting events established in 1984